Si Riguleng (Mongolian:Sergelen; born 16 May 1980 in Inner Mongolia) is a male Southern Mongol freestyle wrestler from PRC who competed at the 2008 Summer Olympics.

His personal best was coming 1st at the 2005 Asian Championships.

External links
Si Riguleng profile - Beijing 2008 Olympic Games Chinese Sports Delegation Roster

1980 births
Living people
Chinese male sport wrestlers
Olympic wrestlers of China
Sportspeople from Inner Mongolia
Wrestlers at the 2008 Summer Olympics
Wrestlers at the 2002 Asian Games
Wrestlers at the 2006 Asian Games
Asian Games competitors for China
21st-century Chinese people